This is the discography of American rap duo, EPMD.

Studio albums

Live albums

EPs

Singles

As lead artist

References

Notes

Citations

Hip hop discographies
Discographies of American artists